Westerton may refer to:

Westerton, County Durham, England
Westerton, East Dunbartonshire, Scotland
Westerton railway station
Westerton, West Sussex, England